Lagardere is a two-part 2003 TV movie, directed by Henri Helman, based on the novel Le Bossu  ("The Hunchback") by Paul Féval.

Cast
Bruno Wolkowitch : Henri de Largardère, le bossu
Yvon Back : Philippe de Gonzague
Clio Baran : Aurore de Nevers, adult
Christian Hecq : Peyrolles
Frédéric Van Den Driessche : Philippe de Nevers
Florence Pernel : Inès de Nevers/Caylus
Jacques Frantz : Cocardasse
Ticky Holgado : Passepoil
Priscilla Bescond : Flore
Julien Guiomar : le Marquis de Caylus
Isabelle Caubère : Anne
Pierre Gérard : Le Régent
Michel Modo : French Ambassador
Florence Muller : Jeanne
Michaël Abiteboul : The drunk man

External links

2003 television films
2003 films
2000s crime thriller films
French television films
2000s French-language films
French crime thriller films
2000s French films